Danilo Žerjal (11 February 1919 – 26 August 1984), later also known as Daniel Cereali, was a Slovenian, Italian and Venezuelan discus thrower and hammer thrower. He competed for Yugoslavia in the 1948 Summer Olympics and Venezuela in the 1959 Pan American Games.

Achievements

References

1919 births
1984 deaths
People from the Municipality of Sežana
Italian male discus throwers
Italian male hammer throwers
Slovenian male discus throwers
Slovenian male hammer throwers
Yugoslav male discus throwers
Yugoslav male hammer throwers
Venezuelan male discus throwers
Venezuelan male hammer throwers
Olympic athletes of Yugoslavia
Athletes (track and field) at the 1948 Summer Olympics
Athletes (track and field) at the 1959 Pan American Games
Pan American Games competitors for Venezuela
Venezuelan people of Slovenian descent
Yugoslav emigrants to Venezuela
Competitors at the 1959 Central American and Caribbean Games
Competitors at the 1962 Central American and Caribbean Games
Central American and Caribbean Games gold medalists for Venezuela
Central American and Caribbean Games silver medalists for Venezuela
Central American and Caribbean Games bronze medalists for Venezuela
Central American and Caribbean Games medalists in athletics